The 2007 Denver Outlaws season was the second season for the Outlaws in Major League Lacrosse. Coming off of their first season in the league and losing in the championship, the Outlaws would finish with a 7–5 record and return to the playoffs for the second consecutive year. However, the Outlaws were unable to avenge themselves from the previous year's championship game and lost to the Philadelphia Barrage in the semifinal by the score of 13–12 in overtime.

Offseason
The Outlaws acquired Drew Westervelt, the 4th overall pick from UMBC in the 2007 Major League Lacrosse Collegiate Draft. They have also hired Jim Beardsmore, who replaced Jarred Testa as new head coach

Regular season

Schedule

Postseason

Standings

References

External links
 Team Website 

Major League Lacrosse seasons
Denver Outlaws